Bar 20 Justice is a 1938 American Western film directed by Lesley Selander and written by Arnold Belgard and Harrison Jacobs. The film stars William Boyd, George "Gabby" Hayes, Russell Hayden, Gwen Gaze, William Duncan and Pat J. O'Brien. The film was released on June 28, 1938, by Paramount Pictures. This was the 16th entry in the "Hopalong Cassidy" western series.

Bar 20 Justice was directed by Lesley Selander, who would eventually helm 27 of the 66 "Cassidy" films.

Plot
Ann Dennis' mine is being used by some criminals to steal ore, cowboy Hopalong Cassidy pursues the crooks through the mine shafts.

Cast
 William Boyd as Hopalong Cassidy
 George "Gabby" Hayes as Windy Halliday
 Russell Hayden as Lucky Jenkins
 Gwen Gaze as Ann Dennis
 William Duncan as Buck Peters
 Pat J. O'Brien as Frazier 
 Paul Sutton as Mine Foreman Slade
 John Beach as Denny Dennis
 Joe De Stefani as Assayer Perkins
 Walter Long as Duke Pierce
 Bruce Mitchell as Ross

References

External links 
 
 
 
 

1938 films
American Western (genre) films
1938 Western (genre) films
Paramount Pictures films
Films directed by Lesley Selander
Hopalong Cassidy films
American black-and-white films
1930s English-language films
1930s American films